The 1985 All-Pacific-10 Conference football team consists of American football players chosen by various organizations for All-Pacific 10 Conference teams for the 1985 college football season.

Offensive selections

Quarterbacks
Chris Miller, Oregon

Running backs
Rueben Mayes, Washington St.
Brad Muster, Stanford
Tony Cherry, Oregon

Wide receivers
 Lew Barnes, Oregon
 Reggie Bynum, Oregon St.

Tight ends
 Greg Baty, Stanford

Tackles
Jeff Bregel, USC
James FitzPatrick, USC

Guards
Mike Hartmeier, UCLA
Keith Kartz, California

Centers
John Barns, Stanford

Defensive selections

Linemen
Mark Walen, UCLA
Erik Howard, Washington St.
 Reggie Rogers, Washington
Terry Tumey, UCLA

Linebackers
Byron Evans, Arizona
Hardy Nickerson, California
Tommy Taylor, UCLA
 Joe Kelly, Washington

Defensive backs
Allan Durden, Arizona
Tim McDonald, USC
David Fulcher, Arizona St.
Vestee Jackson, Washington

Special teams

Placekickers
John Lee, UCLA

Punters
 Mike Schuh, Arizona St.

Return specialists 
Kitrick Taylor, Washington St.

Key

See also
1985 College Football All-America Team

References

All-Pacific-10 Conference Football Team
All-Pac-12 Conference football teams